Tondi Fatehpur is a town and a nagar panchayat in Jhansi district in the Indian state of Uttar Pradesh.

Demographics
As of the 2001 Census of India, Tondi Fatehpur had a population of 10,099. Males constituted 54% of the population and females 46%. Tondi Fatehpur had an average literacy rate of 48%, lower than the national average of 59.5%: male literacy was 62%, and female literacy 31%. In Tondi Fatehpur, 17% of the population was under 6 years of age.

References

Cities and towns in Jhansi district